The Cannonball is a seasonal named train operated by the Long Island Rail Road between Penn Station and Montauk. The train operates from May through October, running Fridays to Montauk and Sundays to New York.

Route

The Cannonball utilizes the Main Line between Penn Station and Jamaica and continues to Montauk either via the entire Montauk Branch or via the Main Line and Central Branch to the Montauk Branch depending on the schedule.

Fare and ticket information
As of April 21, 2019, an adult one-way ticket from Penn Station (Zone 1) to stations in The Hamptons (Zone 14) costs $30.50 (at the ticket machine or MYmta app) or $37.00 (if purchased on-board the train.) Hamptons Reserve Service costs an additional $20.00 which allows reserved seating and additional on-board services in the two rear cars.

On-board services

Hamptons Reserve Service
Introduced in 2001 to replace the parlor cars, the two rear cars of the train are reserved for Hamptons Reserve Service, a premium service with reserved seating and full bar service reminiscent of the previous parlor cars.

History

Pre-MTA
Originally known as the Cannon Ball, it first ran in 1899 between Long Island City and (via two sections east of Manorville) Montauk and Greenport. The Cannon Ball carried both standard-fare coaches and parlor cars. The section to Greenport was discontinued in 1942 and the train was re-routed via the Montauk Branch when the Manorville Branch closed in 1949.

Post-MTA
After the MTA takeover of the LIRR, the name of the train changed to Cannonball. Parlor cars were retired in 2000 and replaced with Hamptons Reserve Service when the LIRR replaced their P72 and P75 coaches with C3s. Beginning in 2013, the western terminus of the train was changed from Long Island City to Penn Station.

Stations
The Cannonball stops at the following stations:

See also
CapeFLYER - A similar service operated by the CCRTA and the MBTA that runs between Boston and Hyannis.

Notes

References

External links

LIRR Hamptons Service | MTA

Metropolitan Transportation Authority
Long Island Rail Road
Named passenger trains of the United States
Railway services introduced in 1899